William Barclay may refer to:

William Barclay (jurist) (1546–1608), Scottish jurist
William Barclay (writer) ( 1570 – c. 1630), Scottish writer
William Barclay (painter) (1797–1859), English miniature painter
William Barclay (theologian) (1907–1978), theologian and writer of Bible commentaries
William Barclay (New York politician) (born 1969), New York State Assemblyman
William Barclay (Northern Ireland politician) (1873–1945), Northern Irish Senator
William Edward Barclay (1857–1917), football manager of Everton and of Liverpool

See also
William Berkeley (disambiguation)